Sphingosine (2-amino-4-trans-octadecene-1,3-diol) is an 18-carbon amino alcohol with an unsaturated hydrocarbon chain, which forms a primary part of sphingolipids, a class of cell membrane lipids that include sphingomyelin, an important phospholipid.

Functions
Sphingosine can be phosphorylated in vivo via two kinases, sphingosine kinase type 1 and sphingosine kinase type 2.  This leads to the formation of sphingosine-1-phosphate, a potent signaling lipid.

Sphingolipid metabolites, such as ceramides, sphingosine and sphingosine-1-phosphate, are lipid signaling molecules involved in diverse cellular processes.

Biosynthesis 
Sphingosine is synthesized from palmitoyl CoA and serine in a condensation required to yield dihydrosphingosine.

 

Dehydrosphingosine is then reduced by NADPH to dihydrosphingosine (sphinganine), acylated to dihydroceramide finally oxidized by FAD to ceramide. Sphingosine is then solely formed via degradation of sphingolipid in the lysosome.

See also
 Dimethylsphingosine
 Fingolimod

References
  article

Additional images

External links
 

Biomolecules
Diols
Amines
Alkene derivatives